Vatica pedicellata is a tree in the family Dipterocarpaceae, native to Borneo. The specific epithet pedicellata refers to the prominent flower stalk or pedicel.

Description
The inflorescences bear cream flowers.

Distribution and habitat
Vatica pedicellata is endemic to Borneo, where it is confined to Sarawak.

Conservation
Vatica pedicellata has been assessed as vulnerable on the IUCN Red List. It is threatened by development projects and land conversion for plantations.

References

pedicellata
Endemic flora of Borneo
Flora of Sarawak
Plants described in 1895